Atari Anniversary Edition is a video-game compilation of Atari arcade games. It was developed by Digital Eclipse and published by Infogrames.

Features
Atari Anniversary Edition features twelve Atari arcade games from over the years within an arcade-based setting. Alongside the games are other features, including interviews with Atari founder Nolan Bushnell, box artworks and manuals, among other special features.

Microsoft Windows
The Microsoft Windows version is a single disc repackage of two previous Atari compilations released by Hasbro Interactive: Atari Arcade Hits, released on 5 July 1999, and Atari Arcade Hits 2, released in 2000. A similar compilation, Atari Greatest Hits, was also released in 2000, and was simply both volumes packaged together as a 2-CD set.

Dreamcast
The Dreamcast version of the game is its own title, and features the same games as the Windows version. It was only released in North America.

PlayStation
The PlayStation version was released as Atari Anniversary Edition Redux, and is similar to the Dreamcast version but has a slightly altered game list, with Millipede and Crystal Castles replaced with Black Widow and Space Duel.

Game Boy Advance
The Game Boy Advance version was the first arcade compilation title released for the system, and was released under the title of Atari Anniversary Advance.

This version contains the same games as Volume 1 of Atari Arcade Hits, but Pong is replaced with Battlezone. It also includes an after-market level replacement hack of Tempest titled "Tempest Tubes", as well as a "Trivia Challenge", which consists of questions about Atari and its 1980s video games.

Games

Windows/Dreamcast/PlayStation

Advance
Atari Anniversary Advance contains six titles.

References

External links
Digital Eclipse page: Atari Arcade Hits 1, Atari Arcade Hits 2, Atari Anniversary Edition (Windows), Atari Anniversary Advance, Atari Anniversary Edition Redux
Atari page: Atari Anniversary Edition (Windows), Atari Anniversary Edition Advance, Atari Anniversary Edition Redux

2001 video games
Infogrames games
Atari video game compilations
Dreamcast games
Game Boy Advance games
PlayStation (console) games
Video games developed in the United States
Windows games
Digital Eclipse games